Pamela Morsi (born March 12, 1951) is an American writer of over 28 romance novels since 1991.

Biography
Morsi is a USA Today Bestselling Author and has written more than 28 novels. Her accolades include being a two-time recipient of the coveted RITA Award for her novels Courting Miss Hattie (1992) and Something Shady (1996). She is a former librarian, with a master's degree from University of Missouri and a BA from Oklahoma State University. Morsi is known for writing primarily fiction and romance novels that feature stories of humor and insight as she portrays the lives of ordinary people in everyday situations. She lives with her husband and daughter in San Antonio, Texas.

Book to film adaptation
Morsi helps in her community on issues regarding accessible transportation and foster parenting for the disabled. She has also helped organize the regional games for Special Olympics. Her interest in people with special needs is also shown through characters in her books, notably the mentally disabled lead character of "Jelly" in her 2010 novel The Bikini Car Wash. The Bikini Car Wash has been optioned for development as In-Plainview (www.In-Plainview.com), a cable network series and feature film spin-off by actor/producer Bryan Kent in Los Angeles.

Bibliography

Stand alone novels
 Mr. Right Goes Wrong (July 2014)
 Love Overdue (August 2013)
 The Lovesick Cure (September 2012)
 The Bentleys Buy a Buick (September 2011)
 The Bikini Car Wash (July 2010)
 The Social Climber of Davenport Heights (April 2010)
 Red's Hot Honky-Tonk Bar (July 2009)
 Last Dance at Jitterbug Lounge (May 2008)
 Bitsy's Bait & BBQ (February 2007)
 The Night We Met (November 2006)
 The Cotton Queen (February 2006)
 By Summer's End (February 2005)
 Suburban Renewal (February 2004)
 Letting Go (March 2003)
 Doing Good (March 2002)
 Here Comes the Bride (July 2000)
 Sweetwood Bride (August 1999)
 Sealed with a Kiss (May 1998)
 No Ordinary Princess (June 1997)
 The Love Charm (November 1996)
 Simple Jess (April 1996)
 Something Shady (July 1995)
 Marrying Stone (August 1994)
 Runabout (February 1994)
 Wild Oats (September 1993)
 Garters (August 1992)
 Courting Miss Hattie (October 1991)
 Heaven Scent (January 1991)

References

External links

American romantic fiction writers
20th-century American novelists
21st-century American novelists
American women novelists
Novelists from Texas
RITA Award winners
Living people
1951 births
Place of birth missing (living people)
University of Missouri alumni
Oklahoma State University alumni
American librarians
American women librarians
Women romantic fiction writers
20th-century American women writers
21st-century American women writers